Peter Charles Burns (5 January 1866 – 11 October 1952) was an Australian rules footballer in the (then) Victorian Football Association (VFA) and Victorian Football League (VFL).

Family
The son of John Burns (1829-1897), and Martha Burns (1833-1914), née Harrison, Peter Charles Burns was born at Steiglitz, Victoria on 5 January 1866. One of his brothers, Allen Burns, played for South Melbourne in the VFL.

Peter Burns married Elizabeth Corbett (1867-1951) in South Melbourne on 18 April 1889.

Football
Burns was a tall ruckman and full-back who made his debut in 1881, aged 16 years, with Ballarat Imperials before transferring to powerful VFA club South Melbourne in 1885.

South Melbourne (VFA)
He played 126 games for South and played in four premierships before joining Geelong in 1892.

Geelong (VFA and VFL)
In his last VFA game, in Round 20 of 1896, Burns played his 216th career game to break the Victorian elite football games record held by former South Melbourne teammate and captain Henry "Sonny" Elms. 

Following the Victorian Football League's formation in 1897, Burns would play a further 89 games before his retirement during the 1902 season, which was due to a leg injury he sustained while playing for Victoria against South Australia on 26 June 1902 rather than any loss of form.

He served as Geelong's timekeeper from his retirement in 1902 until the end of the 1941 season (the sixtieth year of his association with Australian rules football). Geelong did not compete in the VFL competition in 1942 and 1943, due to war-time travel restrictions.

At the end of the 1899 season, in the process of naming his own "champion player", the football correspondent for The Argus ("Old Boy"), selected a team of the best players of the 1899 VFL competition:Backs: Maurie Collins (Essendon), Bill Proudfoot (Collingwood), Peter Burns (Geelong); Halfbacks: Pat Hickey (Fitzroy), George Davidson (South Melbourne), Alf Wood (Melbourne); Centres: Fred Leach (Collingwood), Firth McCallum (Geelong), Harry Wright (Essendon); Wings: Charlie Pannam (Collingwood), Eddie Drohan (Fitzroy), Herb Howson (South Melbourne); Forwards: Bill Jackson (Essendon), Eddy James (Geelong), Charlie Colgan (South Melbourne); Ruck: Mick Pleass (South Melbourne), Frank Hailwood (Collingwood), Joe McShane (Geelong); Rovers: Dick Condon (Collingwood), Bill McSpeerin (Fitzroy), Teddy Rankin (Geelong).From those he considered to be the three best players — that is, Condon, Hickey, and Pleass — he selected Pat Hickey as his "champion player" of the season. ('Old Boy', "Football: A Review of the Season", (Monday, 18 September 1899), p.6).

305 VFA/VFL games
Burns was the first player in elite Australian rules football to play 250 games, achieving this feat in Round 17 of the 1898 VFL season, and subsequently the first to play 300 games, achieving this feat in Round 2 of 1902. 

His career total of 305 games remained a Victorian elite football record until it was broken by Gordon Coventry in the 1937 Grand Final, which was also Coventry's last game, with Burns in attendance as Geelong's timekeeper.

Other matches
Burns also played 14 intercolonial/interstate football matches for Victoria. If these are included, Burns was also the first player to play 300 career senior games, a feat he achieved in Round 6 of 1901, and his total of 319 career senior games was an elite Victorian elite football record until it was broken by Gordon Coventry in Round 10 of 1937; Coventry retired at the end of that season with 331 career senior games.

Death
He died at his residence in Williamstown, Victoria on 11 October 1952.

Honours
In 1996, Burns was inducted into the Australian Football Hall of Fame.

Footnotes

References 
 
 de Lacy, H.A., "Unforgettable Characters in Football: Greatest Player Game Has Produced", Sporting Globe, (Saturday, 3 May 1941), p.6.
 60 Years Connected With Football: Peter Burns Celebrates Diamond Jubilee, The (Emerald Hill) Record, Saturday, 9 May 1942), p.3.

External links 

 Boyles Football Photos: Peter Burns.

1866 births
1952 deaths
Australian rules footballers from Victoria (Australia)
Australian Rules footballers: place kick exponents
Ballarat Imperial Football Club players
South Melbourne Football Club (VFA) players
Geelong Football Club (VFA) players
Geelong Football Club players
Ballarat Football Club players
Australian Football Hall of Fame inductees